Purupuruni is a group of lava domes in southern Peru and a correlative geological formation. They are among the many volcanoes that exist in Peru and whose activity has been associated with the subduction of the Nazca Plate beneath the South America Plate. Purupuruni is associated with a geothermal field and a caldera. Volcanic activity occurred during the Pleistocene 53,000 ± 8,000 years ago but also during the Holocene about 5,300 ± 1,100 years ago; today the volcano is considered to be a low hazard volcano but is being monitored nevertheless.

Geography and geomorphology 

The volcano is part of the  geopark. The term  means dung in Aymara. 

The domes are accompanied by intrusions and lava and pyroclastic flow deposits.

The volcanism appears to come from fissure vents and the volcanoes have been affected by faulting. The volcano lies east-southeast from Yucamane volcano and just south of the Mauri River; the Mauri River is part of the Lake Titicaca watershed. 

The Borateras geothermal field with about 40 separate manifestations is associated with Purupuruni and neighbouring volcanoes such as Coverane and Jaruma across the Mauri River and west from Purupuruni respectively. The Borateras field is used as a spa at the Calachaca spa. The landscape is relatively dry and cold and thus vegetation is scarce.

Geology 

The volcanic rocks are mainly andesitic and dacitic, and contain amphibole, biotite, olivine, plagioclase and pyroxene and are among the most differentiated volcanics in the area. They are part of the wider "Purupurini Volcanics", which are named after Purupuruni and also form other volcanoes in the region.

Geological context 

Rock formations in the region include the Mesozoic Yura Group sediments, the Toquepala intrusive rocks, the 30-24 million years old Tacaza volcanic rocks, the 24-10 million years old Huaylillas volcanic rocks and the 10-3 million years old Barroso volcanic rocks; Purupuruni is considered to be part of this Barroso formation. Purupuruni and neighbouring volcanic centres have formed on the Cretaceous sedimentary basement.

Volcanism in Peru occurs mainly in the southern part of the country, where there are about 300 separate volcanic systems including El Misti, Ubinas, Ticsani, Sabancaya and Huaynaputina. In the Tacna Region of Peru alone there are over 60 separate volcanoes, two of which, Tutupaca and Yucamane, have been active in historical time.

Geologic history 

The volcanic centres in the area including Purupuruni are of Miocene to Pliocene age, and appear to be of Pleistocene age. Purupuruni formed during the last 100,000 years and appears to have developed between two interglacials; fission-track dating on glasses from Purupuruni has yielded ages of 53,000 ± 8,000 years ago but more recent surface exposure dating has yielded an age of 5,300 ± 1,100 years before present on one of the southern domes. The volcano is considered to be a low-hazard system and in 2018 the Peruvian Geological Institute announced it would begin monitoring Purupuruni and nine other volcanoes. Earthquake swarms in 2020 and 2021 do not appear to have been caused by volcanism; they are instead linked to local fault activity.

Glacial erosion took place on Purupuruni during the Pleistocene, leaving moraines on the domes although research published in 2019 has found that the domes have not been eroded by glaciers even though evidence of glaciation occurs in the wider area. Alluvial, glacial and fluvial deposits occur in the region, with aeolian sediments consisting of volcanic ash mantling the volcanic structures.

References

Sources 

 
 
 
 
 
 
 
 

Mountains of Peru
Mountains of Tacna Region
Holocene volcanoes